Acaulopage is a genus in the former Zygomycota that preys on amoeba.

Morphology
Species of Acaulopage are characterized by coenocytic hyphae that have patches of yellowish adhesive patches used to capture amoeba. Conidia are borne directly on the hyphae and vary widely in morphology. Many bear one to many empty appendages.  For example, A. marantica conidia have a single appendage; A. tetraceros conidia have an average of four appendages; and, A. lasiospora conidia are covered in appendages. Zygospores are globose with ornamented walls.

Ecology
Species are often recovered from soil or leaf litter placed on agar in Petri dishes. Acaulopage tetroceros is the most commonly reported species.

Species
According to Gerald L. Benny, there are 27 species of Acaulopage.
Acaulopage acanthospora Drechsler 1938
Acaulopage aristata Jones 1959
Acaulopage baulispora Drechsler 1948
Acaulopage ceratospora Drechsler 1935
Acaulopage cercospora Drechsler 1936
Acaulopage crobylospora Drechsler 1947
Acaulopage dactylophora Drechsler 1955
Acaulopage dasyspora Drechsler 1955
Acaulopage dichotoma Drechsler 1945
Acaulopage gomphoclada Drechsler 1942
Acaulopage gyrinoides Drechsler 1948
Acaulopage hystricospora Drechsler 1946
Acaulopage ischnospora Drechsler 1947
Acaulopage lasiospora Drechsler 1942
Acaulopage longicornis Drechsler 1955
Acaulopage lophospora Drechsler 1946
Acaulopage macrospora Drechsler 1935
Acaulopage marantica Drechsler 1939
Acaulopage retusa Jones 1959
Acaulopage rhaphidospora Drechsler 1935
Acaulopage rhicnospora Drechsler 1935
Acaulopage stenospora Drechsler 1941
Acaulopage tenuicornis Drechsler 1959
Acaulopage tetraceros Drechsler 1935
Acaulopage tigrina C. Ciccicone 1989
Acaulopage trachyspora Drechsler 1959

References

Zygomycota
Fungus genera